Acorna's People (1999) is a science fantasy novel by American writers Anne McCaffrey and Elizabeth Ann Scarborough. It was the third book published in the Acorna Universe series initiated by McCaffrey and Margaret Ball in Acorna: The Unicorn Girl (1997); McCaffrey and Scarborough have extended the series through ten books as of 2011.

Synopsis

In the book, Acorna has finally been reunited with her people - the Linyaari -and has travelled to the new homeworld of her people Narhii - Vhiliinyar to learn about her lost culture. However, she is distinctly different from her people due to her unusual upbringing, and most are not accepting of her. The only people who really befriend her are her aunt, Neeva and her shipmates, and the oldest Linyaari Grandam Naadiina, as well as the young girl named Maati. All of her friends on the ship Balakiire are called away on Acorna's first day on her planet, to investigate the loss of communication with certain off-world Linyaari colonies. This loss of communication soon spreads, and more ships are launched, but all join the missing and soon the fate of her spacefaring friends is placed in Acorna's hands.

References

1999 American novels
1999 fantasy novels
1999 science fiction novels
Novels by Anne McCaffrey
American fantasy novels
American science fiction novels
Acorna
HarperCollins books